America Ammayi may refer to:
 America Ammayi (film), a 1976 Indian Telugu-language film
 America Ammayi (TV series), a Telugu soap opera